Brian Carney (born 2 June 1931) is an Australian former cricketer. He played one first-class match for Tasmania in 1959/60.

See also
 List of Tasmanian representative cricketers

References

External links
 

1931 births
Living people
Australian cricketers
Tasmania cricketers
Cricketers from Launceston, Tasmania